Archie Joseph Jones (born 13 July 2001) is an English professional footballer who plays as a midfielder for Isthmian League side Bishop's Stortford

Career
On 12 November 2019, after progressing through the club's academy, Jones made his debut for Peterborough United in a 2–1 EFL Trophy win against rivals Cambridge United. Jones appeared on the bench in a 4-0 EFL League One defeat to Rotherham United in December 2019.

On 11 May 2021 it was announced that he would leave Peterborough at the end of his contract.

Career statistics

References

2001 births
Living people
Association football midfielders
English footballers
Peterborough United F.C. players
Bishop's Stortford F.C. players